Gift Focus magazine is a trade publication and web site owned by KD Media Publishing Ltd. It is a business-to-business (B2B) magazine brand predominantly aimed at UK giftware retailers including independent retailers, high street multiples, department stores, garden centres, heritage outlets and other gift stockists. It is the official journal of the Giftware Association. Its editorial offices are in Witham, Essex UK and its editor is Rachel Westall.

Established in 1998, Gift Focus magazine is published bi-monthly.

References

External links
Gift Focus magazine website

Business magazines published in the United Kingdom
Professional and trade magazines
Magazines established in 1998
Bi-monthly magazines published in the United Kingdom